The 1976 Pau Grand Prix was a Formula Two motor race held on 7 June 1976 at the Pau circuit, in Pau, Pyrénées-Atlantiques, France. The Grand Prix was won by René Arnoux, driving the Martini MK19. Jacques Laffite finished second and Jean-Pierre Jabouille third.

Classification

Race

References

Pau Grand Prix
1976 in French motorsport